Linda Pauwels (born 1963) is the First Latina Captain at American Airlines. She is also the youngest woman jet captain (cargo) at age 25 on a Boeing 707, in 1988.

Life 
Pauwels was born Linda Pfeiffer in San Pedro, Buenos Aires, she has been married to Frederick Pauwels, airline pilot, since 1981, and has two children. Her grandfather is Polish General Franciszek “Radwan” Pfeiffer, commander of longest fighting unit during Warsaw Uprising. She graduated from Miami Dade College’s North Campus at age 22 in 1985 and was inducted into the MDC Hall of Fame in 2005.

Career 
She has been with American Airlines since 1988, has also served as Check Airman (instructor/evaluator) on A-320 and presently on B-787, the latter as a designated examiner on behalf of FAA. In 2000, she became American Airlines' first Hispanic woman captain on a McDonnell Douglas MD-80 and, in 2015, the company's first Hispanic woman to be a Check Airman.

Before American Airlines, she was a pilot for Southern Air Transport. They were a military and civilian contractor, known for having been owned by the CIA before Congress required them to divest ownership.

She was a columnist for the Orange County Register and has published two books, Beyond Haiku: Pilots Write Poetry, and Beyond Haiku: Women Pilots Write Poetry, which features never-before published poems by Amelia Earhart.

In celebration of International Women’s Day of 2021, American Airlines operated a flight with an all-female crew both on the plane and the ground from Miami to Dallas-Fort Worth. Linda Pauwels led the flight crew.

References 

1963 births
Living people
Miami Dade College alumni